Estradiol benzoate/progesterone/testosterone propionate (EB/P4/TP), sold under the brand names Lukestra, Steratrin, Trihormonal, and Trinestryl, is an injectable combination medication of estradiol benzoate (EB), an estrogen, progesterone (P4), a progestogen, and testosterone propionate (TP), an androgen/anabolic steroid. It contained 1 to 3 mg EB, 20 to 25 mg P4, and 25 mg TP, was provided in the form of ampoules, and was administered by intramuscular injection. The medication was introduced by 1949 and was marketed in the United States, the United Kingdom, and Germany among other places. It is no longer available.

See also
 List of combined sex-hormonal preparations § Estrogens, progestogens, and androgens

References

Abandoned drugs
Combined estrogen–progestogen–androgen formulations